Aquinas Schools, also known as Fort Madison Catholic Schools, was a Roman Catholic school in Fort Madison, Iowa.

History

In 1997 it had the following campuses: Happy World Preschool and Aquinas East Elementary School, Aquinas West Middle School, and Aquinas Junior-Senior High School; the high school housed the administrative offices of the system.
It had the same campuses in 2004, before the school's merger, as Aquinas East Primary, Aquinas West Middle, and Aquinas High School, with the headquarters at the high school.

In 2005 Aquinas Schools merged with the Marquette Catholic School System of West Point to form Holy Trinity Catholic Schools. Doris Turner, who began as principal of the Aquinas system circa 2003, became the principal of Holy Trinity after the merger. The Marquette building was chosen for junior high school while the Aquinas building was chosen for senior high school. At the time 131 students were at the secondary level in Aquinas. The merger was due to increasing costs and the declining population of Lee County, the latter of which meant reduced numbers of pupils.

Athletics
The Herald-Whig wrote that "Aquinas and Marquette have been spirited rivals for years."

References

External links
 
  - At Great River Area Education Agency 16

Catholic secondary schools in Iowa
Catholic high schools in the United States
Catholic middle schools in the United States
Catholic elementary schools in the United States
Roman Catholic Diocese of Davenport
Schools in Lee County, Iowa
2005 disestablishments in Iowa
Educational institutions disestablished in 2005
Private middle schools in Iowa
Private elementary schools in Iowa
Fort Madison, Iowa